The 1939–40 NCAA men's basketball season began in December 1939, progressed through the regular season and conference tournaments, and concluded with the 1940 NCAA basketball tournament Championship Game on March 30, 1940, at Municipal Auditorium in Kansas City, Missouri. The Indiana Hoosiers won their first NCAA national championship with a 60–42 victory over the Kansas Jayhawks.

Rule changes 
After a foul, teams received the option of either taking a free throw or taking the ball at mid-court.

Season headlines 

 In its second year, the NCAA tournament turned a profit (of $9,500) for the first time.
 In February 1943, the Helms Athletic Foundation retroactively selected USC as its national champion for the 1939–40 season.
 In 1995, the Premo-Porretta Power Poll retroactively selected Indiana as its national champion for the 1939–40 season.

Conference membership changes 

NOTE: Columbia left the Metropolitan New York Conference while retaining membership in the Eastern Intercollegiate Basketball League. It was a member of both from 1933 until 1939.

Regular season

Conference winners and tournaments

Statistical leaders

Post-season tournaments

NCAA tournament

Semifinals & finals

National Invitation tournament

Semifinals & finals 

 Third Place – Oklahoma A&M 23, DePaul 22

Awards

Consensus All-American teams

Major player of the year awards 

 Helms Player of the Year: George Glamack, North Carolina (retroactive selection in 1944)

Other major awards 

 NIT/Haggerty Award (Top player in New York City metro area): Ben Auerbach, NYU

Coaching changes

References